Team WLF.org Golf Classic was an annual golf tournament for professional women golfers on the Futures Tour, the LPGA Tour's developmental tour. The event was played from 2005 through 2007 at the Kankakee Elks Country Club in the Kankakee, Illinois area.

The title sponsor from 2006 was the World Leadership Foundation (WLF), an international Christian-based training ministry.

The tournament was a 54-hole event, as are most Futures Tour tournaments, and included pre-tournament pro-am opportunities, in which local amateur golfers can play with the professional golfers from the Tour as a benefit for local charities. The benefiting charity from this tournament is the WLF.

Tournament names through the years: 
2005: Kankakee Futures Golf Classic
2006–2007: Team WLF.org Golf Classic

The tournament was last held from June 29 through July 1, 2007.

Winners

* Championship won in sudden-death playoff.

Tournament records

External links
Futures Tour official website
Kankakee Elks Country Club official website

Former Symetra Tour events
Golf in Illinois
Kankakee, Illinois
Recurring sporting events established in 2005
Recurring sporting events disestablished in 2007
2005 establishments in Illinois
2007 disestablishments in Illinois